Chris Ellison may refer to:
 Chris Ellison (actor) (born 1946), English actor
 Chris Ellison (businessman) (born c. 1957), New Zealand entrepreneur
 Chris Ellison (politician) (born 1954), member of the Australian Senate
 Chris Ellison (cricketer) (born 1979), English cricketer